Sarah K. Elfreth (born September 9, 1988) is a Democratic member of the Maryland Senate representing the 30th district.

Background 
Elfreth was raised in Barrington, New Jersey and graduated from Haddon Heights High School in 2006. She attended Towson University and received her BA in Political Sciences in 2010. In 2012, Elfreth earned her MS in Public Policy from Johns Hopkins University where she worked as a Research Assistant in the Office of Government and Community Affairs from 2010 to 2012. Elfreth serves as an adjunct professor for Towson University's Honors College.

Elfreth became active in politics while attending Towson University, when she became involved with student government and began traveling to Annapolis to lobby the Maryland General Assembly. In 2009, Maryland governor Martin O'Malley appointed Elfreth to be the student member of the University System Board of Regents. She didn't become involved with electoral politics until a few years later after hearing a speech by former Vermont Governor Madeleine Kunin. She briefly served in the office of House Minority Whip Steny Hoyer before working as the Government Affairs Director at the National Aquarium of Baltimore.

After moving to Annapolis, Elfreth became involved with local politics, becoming a member of the Ward 1 Residents Association and serving on the District 30 Democratic Club. In June 2017, Elfreth filed to run for Maryland Senate, seeking to succeed state Senator John Astle, who did not seek re-election to run for Mayor of Annapolis. She was elected to the Maryland Senate with 53.8 percent of the vote against former Delegate Ron George.

In the legislature 
Elfreth was sworn into the Maryland Senate on January 9, 2019. She is currently the youngest woman ever to serve in the Maryland Senate. Elfreth is a member of the Budget and Taxation Committee, Joint Committee on Ending Homelessness, Education, Business, and Administration Subcommittee of the Budget and Taxation Committee, Capital Budget Subcommittee of the Budget and Taxation Committee, and Special Joint Committee on Pensions. She is Senate chair of the Joint Committee on the Chesapeake and Atlantic Coastal Bay Critical Areas.

Committee assignments
 Member, Budget and Taxation Committee, 2019–present (capital budget subcommittee, 2019, 2021–present; education, business & administration subcommittee, 2019–present; chair, pensions subcommittee, 2020–present, member, 2019–present)
Senate Chair, Joint Committee on the Chesapeake and Atlantic Coastal Bays Critical Areas, 2019–present 
Member, Joint Committee on Ending Homelessness, 2019–present
 Senate Chair, Joint Committee on Administrative, Executive and Legislative Review, 2020–present
 Special Joint Committee on Pensions, 2020–present (member, 2019–present)
 Member, State Park Investment Commission, 2021–present
 Member, Work Group to Study Shelter and Supportive Services for Unaccompanied Homeless Minors, 2019–2020
 Member, Senate President's Advisory Work Group on Equity and Inclusion, 2020–2021

Other memberships
 Senate Chair, Anne Arundel County Delegation, 2021–present
 Member, Maryland Veterans Caucus, 2019–present (senate executive board, 2022–present)
 Member, Women Legislators of Maryland, 2019–present

Political positions

Elections
During the 2021 legislative session, Elfreth introduced the "Student and Military Voter Empowerment Act", which would require higher education institutions to create websites to provide students with voting information and allow military members to register to vote using their Department of Defense Common Access Card. The bill passed and became law without Governor Larry Hogan's signature on May 30, 2021.

Environment
During the 2020 legislative session, Elfreth proposed legislation to allow jurisdictions to create Resilience Authorities to provide funding to large infrastructure projects related to sea level rise, nuisance flooding, and erosion. She also co-sponsored legislation to expand the public's role in rehabilitation projects in the Chesapeake Bay Bridge resurfacing project.

During the 2021 legislative session, Elfreth introduced various environmental bills, including:
 Senate Bill 62, which would create the position of Chief Resilience Officer within the Maryland Emergency Management Agency
 Senate Bill 319, which would expand the state's clean energy loan program to include water efficiency projects, environmental remediation projects, and climate resilience projects
 Senate Bill 119, which would establish a fund to reduce pollution in Maryland waterways
 Senate Bill 195, which would require Maryland to switch to safer alternatives in firefighting foam and ban PFAS chemicals in food packaging

During the 2022 legislative session, Elfreth introduced legislation that would require the Maryland State Retirement and Pensions System to consider climate change as a financial factor when making investment decisions. The bill passed and became law on April 9, 2022.

Government
During the 2019 legislative session, Elfreth introduced legislation to expand the Board of Regents' membership and implement additional oversight reforms. The bill passed both chambers unanimously and was signed into law by Governor Hogan on April 30, 2019.

During the 2021 legislative session, Elfreth introduced legislation to create an "Office of Digital Inclusion" in the Maryland Department of Housing and Community Development. The bill passed and was signed into law by Governor Hogan on April 13, 2021. She also introduced legislation that would require the state's Commission on Environmental Justice and sustainable Communities to "reflect the racial, gender, ethnic, and geographic diversity of the state". The bill passed and became law on May 30, 2021.

Paid family leave
During the 2020 legislative session, Elfreth introduced legislation to provide Maryland workers with up to 12 weeks of paid family leave, funded by a payroll tax shared equally by the worker and employer.

Social issues
Elfreth supports abortion rights, describing access to abortion services as a matter of economics.

During the 2019 legislative session, Elfreth introduced a resolution to designate June 28 as "Freedom of the Press Day" in honor of the five killed at the Capital Gazette shooting. The bill passed unanimously and became law on April 18, 2019. In June 2019, Governor Hogan signed a proclamation declaring June 28 to be "Freedom of the Press Day" in Maryland.

During the 2021 legislative session, Elfreth introduced legislation to provide students access to menstrual products in school bathrooms. The bill passed and became law on May 30, 2021.

During the 2022 legislative session, Elfreth introduced the "Great Maryland Outdoors Act", which would increase staffing, expand recreational amenities, and improve equity of access for Maryland state parks. The bill passed and became law on April 24, 2022.

Electoral history

References

1988 births
Living people
Haddon Heights Junior/Senior High School alumni
Democratic Party Maryland state senators
Towson University alumni
Johns Hopkins University alumni
21st-century American politicians
21st-century American women politicians
Towson University faculty
People from Barrington, New Jersey
Politicians from Camden County, New Jersey
Women state legislators in Maryland